Lip-Bu Tan (born November 12, 1959) is a Malaysian-born American executive and entrepreneur presently the executive chairman of Cadence Design Systems and Chairman of Walden International, a venture capital firm.

Early life and education
Born in 1959 in Muar, Johor, Federation of Malaya (in modern Malaysia) to a Malaysian Chinese family, Tan grew up in Singapore and graduated from Nanyang University with a BSc in physics. Tan later completed an M.S. in nuclear engineering at the Massachusetts Institute of Technology (MIT) in the U.S. Tan began Ph.D. studies in the subject at MIT, but because the 1979 Three Mile Island accident caused a sharp reduction in opportunities in the nuclear industry, Tan left MIT and transferred to the University of San Francisco, where he graduated with an MBA.

Business career
Tan was a manager at EDS Nuclear and ECHO Energy and partner at the Walden USA investment fund before founding venture capital firm Walden International in 1987. He named the firm after the book Walden by Henry David Thoreau because Tan's goal was to be like Thoreau: "contrarian, rather than just following the trend." Growing from $20 million upon its founding to $2 billion by 2001, Walden International has focused its investments on semiconductor, alternative energy, and digital media businesses and startups in the U.S. and Asia such as Ambarella Inc., Creative Technology, S3 Graphics, and Sina Corp. For Tan's breakthrough investments in Asian tech startups, Forbes dubbed Tan "the pioneer of Asian VC" in 2001.

On February 10, 2004, the Cadence Design Systems board of directors elected Tan to the board. Tan became interim co-CEO in October 2008 following the resignation of Michael Fister in October 2008. The Cadence board formally named Tan president and CEO effective January 8, 2009. Under Tan's leadership, Cadence grew its net worth to $1.3 billion by 2012, including $440 million in that year alone. Cadence also expanded its Shanghai office in 2012. In 2013, Cadence purchased private chip design company Tensilica for $380 million. On November 16, 2017, Tan dropped the title of president while remaining CEO of Cadence.

In 2017, the analytics firm Relationship Science named him most connected executives in the technology industry garnering a perfect "power score" of 100.

Boards and memberships
From 2006 to 2011, Tan was a trustee of Nanyang Technological University in Singapore. Tan also served on the Regent College Board of Governors from 2006 to 2012. Additionally, Tan currently directs the boards of Hewlett Packard Enterprise, Schneider Electric, and Softbank and has served on the boards of Ambarella, Flextronics International, Inphi Corporation, Mindtree, Semiconductor Manufacturing International Corporation, UC Berkeley College of Engineering, and United Overseas Bank. He is also a member of the Committee of 100.  As of 2022, he currently sits on the Board of Directors for Intel Corporation.

Tan has also been an elder at the First Presbyterian Church of Berkeley since the 1990s.

Philanthropy
In November 2019, Tan and Cadence Design Systems endowed two computer science professorships for $3 million each at Carnegie Mellon University.

Personal life
Tan lives in Piedmont, California, with his wife Ysa Loo. They have two grown children.

References 

Living people
1959 births
21st-century American businesspeople
American chairpersons of corporations
American computer businesspeople
American venture capitalists
American technology chief executives
American people of Chinese descent
Malaysian emigrants to the United States
Malaysian people of Chinese descent
People from Muar
People from Piedmont, California
American Presbyterians
Nanyang University alumni
MIT School of Engineering alumni
University of San Francisco alumni
20th-century American businesspeople
People from Singapore